In theoretical physics, a no-go theorem is a theorem that states that a particular situation is not physically possible. Specifically, the term describes results in quantum mechanics like Bell's theorem and the Kochen–Specker theorem that constrain the permissible types of hidden variable theories which try to explain the apparent randomness of quantum mechanics as a deterministic model featuring hidden states.

Instances of no-go theorems
Full descriptions of the no-go theorems named below are given in other articles linked to their names. A few of them are broad, general categories under which several theorems fall. Other names are broad and general-sounding but only refer to a single theorem.

 Antidynamo theorems is a general category of theorems that restrict the type of magnetic fields that can be produced by dynamo action.
 Cowling's theorem states that an axisymmetric magnetic field cannot be maintained through a self-sustaining dynamo action by an axially symmetric current.
 Earnshaw's theorem states that a collection of point charges cannot be maintained in a stable stationary equilibrium configuration solely by the electrostatic interaction of the charges.
 Bell's theorem
 Kochen–Specker theorem
 PBR theorem
 Weinberg–Witten theorem states that massless particles (either composite or elementary) with spin  cannot carry a Lorentz-covariant current, while massless particles with spin  cannot carry a Lorentz-covariant stress-energy. It is usually interpreted to mean that the graviton  in a relativistic quantum field theory cannot be a composite particle.
 Nielsen–Ninomiya theorem limits when it is possible to formulate a chiral lattice theory for fermions.
 Haag's theorem states that the interaction picture does not exist in an interacting, relativistic, quantum field theory (QFT).
 Hegerfeldt's theorem implies that localizable free particles are incompatible with causality in relativistic quantum theory.
 Coleman–Mandula theorem states that "space-time and internal symmetries cannot be combined in any but a trivial way".
 Haag–Łopuszański–Sohnius theorem is a generalisation of the Coleman–Mandula theorem.
 Goddard–Thorn theorem or the no-ghost theorem, 
 Type IIB compactification no-go theorem: any compactification of type IIB string theory on a internal compact space with no brane sources will necessarily have a trivial wrap factor and trivial fluxes.
 No-hiding theorem
 No-cloning theorem
 Quantum no-deleting theorem
 No-teleportation theorem
 No-broadcast theorem
 The no-communication theorem in quantum information theory gives conditions under which instantaneous transfer of information between two observers is impossible.
 No-programming theorem

Proof of impossibility 

In mathematics there is the concept of proof of impossibility referring to problems impossible to solve. The difference between this impossibility and that of the no-go theorems is: a proof of impossibility states a category of logical proposition that may never be true; a no-go theorem instead presents a sequence of events that may never occur.

See also 

Arrow's impossibility theorem

References

External links
 
Beating no-go theorems by engineering defects in quantum spin models (2014)

Quantum field theory
Supersymmetry